The Beneš-Mráz Be-150 Beta-Junior was a light aerobatic trainer and racing aircraft, designed and built in Czechoslovakia in the late 1930s.

Design and development
With the success of the Beneš-Mráz Be-50 Beta-Minor Beneš decided to produce a smaller version with better performance for sport flying. A major incentive was the availability of five spare  Walter Junior engines, which would imbue the Be-150 with much improved vertical performance compared to the Be-50.

Beneš shortened the fuselage and fitted the short-span wings of the Be-52, retaining the open cockpits and fixed, trousered, tailwheel undercarriage of the Be-50.

Operational history
The Be-150 was first flown on 5 January 1937, but was rejected by the MNO (Czechoslovak Ministry of Defense) and the three production aircraft were used for general flying club use and for air racing.

Specifications (Be-150)

References

1930s Czechoslovakian sport aircraft
Beta-Junior
Single-engined tractor aircraft
Low-wing aircraft
Aircraft first flown in 1937
Aerobatic aircraft